This is a list of airports in the nation state of Solomon Islands, sorted by location. Other airports within the Solomon Islands archipelago but outside of Solomon Islands can be found at list of airports in Papua New Guinea



Airports 

Airport names shown in bold indicate the airport has scheduled service on commercial airlines.

See also 
 Transport in Solomon Islands
 List of airports by ICAO code: A#AG - Solomon Islands
 Wikipedia:WikiProject Aviation/Airline destination lists: Oceania#Solomon Islands

References 

 
  – includes IATA codes
 Great Circle Mapper: Solomon Islands – IATA and ICAO codes

Solomon Islands
 
Airports
Solomon Islands
Airports